Manjalumoodu is a village in the Kanniyakumari district in the state of Tamil Nadu, India.

Nearby villages

 Arudesam
 Keezhkulam
 Paloor
 Kilamalai R F
 Puliyoorsalai
 Muzhucode
 Malayadi
 Vanniyoor
 Maruthancode
 Vellamcode
 Kulappuram

Agriculture

Manjalumoodu is a small island located in Vilavancode taluk in the district of Kanniyakumari district in the state of Tamil Nadu, India. It is very close to the foothills of the Western Ghats with all of the available land in the village used for harvesting rubber. The main occupation in this area is rubber tapping which is the process by which latex is collected from a rubber tree.

Vilavancode is the nearest town to Manjalumoodu village.

Education

Narayanaguru College of Engineering, an affiliate of University Chennai, is located near Manjalumoodu. The Sigma College of Architecture is also near Manjalumoodu.

References

Cities and towns in Kanyakumari district